The 1941 VPI Gobblers football team was an American football team that represented Virginia Agricultural and Mechanical College and Polytechnic Institute in Southern Conference during the 1941 college football season.  In their first season under head coach Jimmy Kitts, the Gobblers compiled a 6–4 record (4–2 against conference opponents), tied for fifth place in the conference, and were outscored by a total of 120 to 112.

Guard Roger McClure as selected by both the Associated Press and the United Press as a second-team player on the 1941 All-Southern Conference football team.

Guard John Maskas was selected by the Boston Yanks in the 14th round (142nd overall pick) of the 1944 NFL Draft. Maskas became the first VPI player to play in the NFL, appearing in 18 games for the Buffalo Bills in 1947 and 1949.

Schedule

Before the Season
The 1940 VPI Gobblers football team compiled a 5–5 record and were led by Henry Redd in his ninth season as head coach. On November 20, 1940, Redd announced that he would resign as VPI head coach to become full-time secretary of the General Alumni Association and the director of the Tech Alumni Fund. After considering other coaches to fill the vacancy (reportedly including Bunny Oakes and John Barnhill), former Rice head coach Jimmy Kitts accepted the VPI head coaching position on February 13, 1941.

In December 1940, the VPI letterwinners chose linemen Bill Tate and Bill Zydiak as co-captains for the 1941 football season.

VPI held a spring game on April 19, 1941. The result was a 26-7 victory over Appalachian State Teachers College, with the Gobblers scoring three touchdowns in the third quarter.

Season summary

Catawba

VPI's first game of the season was a victory over Catawba at Miles Stadium. In the first quarter, VPI's Jack Gallagher completed a 46-yard pass to Gene Wheeler for the game's first touchdown, with Roger McClure kicking the extra point. In the second quarter, Gobblers fullback Mason Blandford did a 70-yard quick kick that stopped at the one-yard line and set up a touchdown by Jim Lively. Ben Judy also scored in the second quarter, completing a safety against Catawba quarterback Dwight Holshouser. VPI had another 70-yard quick kick, this time by Bobby Smith, in the third quarter that set up a touchdown by Bill Tate. Catawba scored their only points in the fourth quarter, when Steve Johnson tackled Lively for a safety. VPI finished the game with 49 yards rushing and 124 yards passing, while Catawba finished with 36 yards rushing and 147 yards passing. VPI also recorded five interceptions.

The starting lineup for VPI was: Johnson (left end), Maskas (left tackle), W. Tate (left guard), Zydiak (center), McClure (right guard), Judy (right tackle), Chasen (right end), James (quarterback), Kern (left halfback), Wheeler (right halfback), Blandford (fullback). The substitutes were: Gallagher, Lively and Smith.

The starting lineup for Catawba was: Donald Hanley (left end), George Haley (left tackle), Hubert Menapace (left guard), Ed Ellis (center), Clayton Clifton Gaddy (right guard), William David Rodeffer (right tackle), Steve Johnson (right end), Dwight Holshouser (quarterback), Anthony Georgiana (left halfback), Louis Green (right halfback), Crayton Robert Benson, Jr. (fullback).

Kentucky

The second game was against Kentucky at the neutral Manual Stadium in Louisville, Kentucky. Kentucky started the scoring on the third play of the game when Ermal Allen rushed for a 38-yard touchdown with Junie Jones making the extra point. Later in the first quarter, the Wildcats' Bill Portwood blocked a VPI punt and Kentucky then scored on a one-yard rushing touchdown by Billy Kincer. In the second quarter, Kentucky's Noah Mullins intercepted a pass by VPI's Billy James and then Carl Althaus caught a 18-yard touchdown pass from Phil Cutchin. Cutchin missed the extra point. At the end of the first half, Wildcat Claude Hammond rushed for a four-yard touchdown and Cutchin's extra point attempt was blocked by VPI. After halftime, the Wildcats' Charley Bill Walker recovered a VPI fumble and Jones rushed for a 32-yard touchdown. In the fourth quarter, VPI's Jim Lively recorded two touchdown catches. The first was a ten-yard catch with Roger McClure kicking the extra point. Lively's second touchdown was a 65-yard pass from Bobby Smith with McClure kicking the extra point. Kentucky scored a final time, another pass from Cutchin to Althaus. VPI finished the game with 38 yards rushing and 208 yards passing, while Kentucky finished with 279 yards rushing and 102 yards passing.

The starting lineup for VPI was: Chasen (left end), Judy (left tackle), Rucker (left guard), Zydiak (center), McClure (right guard), Maskas (right tackle), W. Johnson (right end), Kern (quarterback), James (left halfback), Wheeler (right halfback), Blandford (fullback). The substitutes were: Lively and Smith.

The starting lineup for Kentucky was: Bill Portwood (left end), Clyde Johnson (left tackle), Norm Beck (left guard), Charley Bill Walker (center), Jack Casner (right guard), Clark Wood (right tackle), Allen Parr (right end), Tommy Zinn (quarterback), Noah Mullins (left halfback), Ermal Allen (right halfback), Billy Kincer (fullback). The substitutes were: Carl Althaus, Bob Beeler, Don Boehler, Phil Cutchin, Claude Hammond, Junie Jones and Charley Kuhn.

Georgetown

VPI's 1941 homecoming game was an upset victory over Georgetown. In the third quarter, Gobbler Bobby Smith punted to Hoya Frank Dornfeld who then fumbled the ball, which Smith recovered. VPI's Roger McClure then kicked a 25-yard field goal, the only points for either side during the game. Near the end of the game, Gobbler Dick Kern fumbled at their own 18-yard line, which was recovered by Georgetown's Ben Reiges. But Georgetown could not take advantage of the field position and turned it over on downs. Georgetown was held scoreless for the first time since 1937. VPI finished the game with 93 yards rushing and 21 yards passing, while Georgetown finished with 51 yards rushing and 40 yards passing.

The starting lineup for VPI was: Chasen (left end), Lawson (left tackle), McClure (left guard), Zydiak (center), R. Anderson (right guard), Judy (right tackle), W. Johnson (right end), Kern (quarterback), James (left halfback), Wheeler (right halfback), Smith (fullback). The substitutes were: Blandford, Clark, Davis, Fuller, Gallagher, T. Johnson, Lively, Maskas, McClure, Rucker, Sharpe, B. Tate, Unterzuber and Wilson.

William & Mary

VPI's game with William & Mary was played at City Stadium in Richmond, Virginia in front of approximately 12,000 fans. W&M's Jack Freeman had two interceptions in the first half, both of which led to scoring drives. W&M's first touchdown was a four-yard run by Jimmy Howard with Harvey Johnson kicking the extra point. The Indians scored again when Johnson kicked a 16-yard field goal at the end of the first half, after missing a field goal wide-right in the first quarter. In the third quarter, VPI had a 63-yard drive that ended with their only points of the game, a one-yard run by Mason Blandford with Roger McClure kicking the extra point. Later in the third quarter, VPI's Jim Lively returned a punt, but was pushed back to VPI's one-yard line. VPI eventually punted and the Indians took over at the Gobblers' 34-yard line. Johnny Korczowski then completed a 30-yard pass to Johnson, and on the next play Korczowski rushed four yards for a touchdown. In the fourth quarter, Freeman fumbled a punt on W&M's 16-yard line. However, the Gobblers were only able to advance to the nine-yard line and did not score. Later in the fourth quarter, the Indians were penalized for clipping and turned the ball over to VPI on W&M's 21-yard line. But again the Gobblers could not score after getting to the 2-yard line.

Davidson

In October, VPI traveled to Davidson, North Carolina to play against Davidson. It was Davidson's homecoming game and Governor of North Carolina J. Melville Broughton was in attendance. The Gobblers' Billy James rushed for a three-yard touchdown in the first quarter with Roger McClure kicking the extra point. In the second quarter, VPI's Bobby Smith missed a 45-yard field goal, which set up Davidson near their own endzone. Wildcat Johnnie Miller then tried to punt on second down and VPI's Ben Tate blocked the punt for a safety. Earl Bethea then punted for Davidson after the safety, which Smith returned for a 65-yard touchdown with McClure kicking the extra point.

The starting lineup for VPI was: Clark (left end), Maskas (left tackle), Unterzuber (left guard), Davis (center), McClure (right guard), Judy (right tackle), Chasen (right end), Kern (quarterback), James (left halfback), Kujawa (right halfback), Smith (fullback). The substitutes were: B. Tate.

Washington and Lee

After their victory over Davidson, VPI won against Washington & Lee in Lynchburg, Virginia. Gobbler Roger McClure opened the scoring with a 41-yard field goal in the first quarter. W&L equaled the score when Frank Socha completed a 14-yard field goal. Later in the first quarter, VPI's Billy James threw a 54-yard touchdown pass to Gerald Clark with McClure kicking the extra point. In the second quarter, VPI's John Maskas recovered a fumble by W&L's Teddy Ciesla and then McClure kicked his second field goal of the game, a 21-yarder. Both kickers attempted field goals in the fourth quarter, but were not successful. In the final two minutes of the game, the Generals' Harry Baugher completed a 57-yard pass to his brother Joe Baugher. But VPI's James intercepted the next pass, ending the game.

The starting lineup for VPI was: Clark (left end), Maskas (left tackle), McClure (left guard), Davis (center), Anderson (right guard), Judy (right tackle), Chasen (right end), Kern (quarterback), James (left halfback), Blandford (right halfback), Smith (fullback).

Virginia

VPI's first game in November was a blowout loss against Virginia at Foreman Field in Norfolk, Virginia. Virginia captain Bill Dudley started the scoring in the second quarter when he threw a 19-yard touchdown to Billy Hill. Dudley then had an 8-yard touchdown pass to Eddie Bryant. Dudley also kicked the extra point for both touchdowns, and the Cavaliers led 14-0 at halftime. In the third quarter, Bryant had a 30-yard rush, followed by an 8-yard touchdown run by Dudley for his third touchdown. His extra point attempt was unsuccessful. Dudley then rushed four yards for his fourth touchdown in the fourth quarter. Virginia's final touchdown was a rush by fullback Don Niklason. Dudley kicked the final two extra points. VPI finished the game with 118 yards rushing and 13 yards passing, while Virginia finished with 245 yards rushing and 100 yards passing. Dudley finished the game with 132 rushing and 109 yards passing, accounting for 28 points.

The Matthew Fontaine Maury High School band performed at halftime. During the game, a VPI fan reportedly released a bulldog on the field.

The starting lineup for VPI was: Wilson (left end), Maskas (left tackle), Anderson (left guard), Zydiak (center), McClure (right guard), W. Tate (right tackle), Clark (right end), Kern (quarterback), James (left halfback), Gallagher (right halfback), Smith (fullback). The substitutes were: Blandford.

NC State

On November 8, VPI completed a comeback victory over NC State in Winston-Salem, North Carolina. NC State's tailback Dick Watts scored both of the Wolfpack touchdowns in the first quarter; the first was a 48-yard touchdown run on a fake reverse and the second was a two-yard rush. NC State's Art Faircloth missed the first extra point, which would be the difference in the final score. In the second quarter, VPI's Jack Gallagher threw a touchdown pass to Gerald Clark with Roger McClure kicking the extra point. After a scoreless third quarter, the Gobblers' Bobby Smith rushed for a touchdown in the fourth quarter to tie the game. McClure extra point attempt was successful, and VPI took the lead. The game ended after Smith intercepted pass during NC State's last drive.

The starting lineup for VPI was: Chasen (left end), Maskas (left tackle), W. Tate (left guard), Zydiak (center), Anderson (right guard), Lawson (right tackle), Clark (right end), Kern (quarterback), James (left halfback), Wheeler (right halfback), Blandford (fullback). The substitutes were: Gallagher, McClure and Smith.

VMI

VPI lost to VMI on Thanksgiving at Lynchburg Municipal Stadiumin Lynchburg, Virginia. VMI's Charlie Parkins rushed 11 yards for the game's first touchdown in the first quarter with Joe Muha kicking the extra point. in the second quarter, VPI's Billy James scored on an 11-yard touchdown run with Roger McClure kicking the extra point. Later in the quarter, McClure completed a 43-yard field goal to give VPI the lead at halftime. After halftime, VMI's Clyde Ellington blocked a punt by Bobby Smith, who fell on the loose ball in the Gobbler endzone for a safety. The final touchdown was a two-yard rush by VMI's Muha to take the lead. Muha's extra point attempt was blocked by VPI's Bill Zydiak. VPI finished the game with 171 yards rushing.

The starting lineup for VPI was: Chasen (left end), Maskas (left tackle), W. Tate (left guard), Zydiak (center), Anderson (right guard), Judy (right tackle), Clark (right end), Kern (quarterback), James (left halfback), Wheeler (right halfback), Smith (fullback). The substitutes were: Blandford, Gallagher, Johnson, Kujawa, Lawson, McClure, B. Tate, Unterzuber and Wilson.

Richmond

VPI's final game of the season was a home victory against Richmond. In the first quarter, VPI drove to Richmond's 18-yard line and then again to their 29-yard line. However, both drives ended on missed field goals by Roger McClure. After stopping the Spiders at their 15-yard line in the second quarter, VPI's Bobby Smith had a 71-yard touchdown down the left sideline with McClure kicking the extra point.  Later in the quarter, VPI's Ralph Unterzuber recovered a fumble by Richmond's Lem Fitzgerald and the Gobblers drove the Spiders' two-yard line. But then VPI's Jack Gallagher fumbled and Richmond recovered, ending the half. Smith scored another touchdown in the third quarter with a one-yard run on fourth down. McClure missed the extra point, his third missed kick of the game. VPI lost the ball again in the fourth quarter with a fumble by Tony Kujawa. VPI finished the game with 342 yards rushing and 56 yards passing, while Richmond finished with 73 yards rushing and 73 yards passing.

The starting lineup for VPI was: Clark (left end), Maskas (left tackle), W. Tate (left guard), Zydiak (center), Anderson (right guard), B. Tate (right tackle), Wilson (right end), Kern (quarterback), Blandford (left halfback), Wheeler (right halfback), Smith (fullback). The substitutes were: Gallagher, Kujawa, McClure and Unterzuber. Billy James was kept out of the game due to an injury sustained during the VMI game.

After the Season
After the 1941 season, players Jim Lively and Bobby Smith left VPI. In August 1942, Head Coach Kitts was commissioned as a lieutenant in the United States Navy Reserve to become a physical training instructor at a Navy Air Force preflight training school. Assistant Coach Jules Medwin also went into the service shortly after Kitts. The athletic council chose assistant coaches Herbert McEver and Sumner D. Tilson to be co-coaches until Kitts returns.

Players

Roster

Varsity letter winners
Twenty-six players received varsity letters for their participation on the 1941 VPI team.

Coaching and training staff
 Head coach: Jimmy Kitts
 Assistant coaches:
 Backfield Coach: Herbert McEver
 Linemen Coach: Sumner D. Tilson
 Trainer: Bill Altman
 Assistant Backfield Coach: Charles "Jules" A. Medwin
 Freshman Coach: Red Laird
 Bill Porterfield
 Manager: John Moore Albright
 Assistant managers:
 Fishburn
 Murphy
 Stone

Scoring Summary

References

VPI
Virginia Tech Hokies football seasons
VPI Gobblers football